Erdington Abbey Church on Sutton Road, Erdington, Birmingham, England, is the more usual name of the grade II listed church of Saints Thomas and Edmund of Canterbury. It is the church of a Roman Catholic parish in the Archdiocese of Birmingham served by the Redemptorists. The abbey itself was the adjacent building, now Highclare School.

Erdington Abbey church
In 1847 Father Heneage built a chapel in Erdington High Street, on the croft opposite the end of Station Lane.

Before this priests from Oscott College had said mass in a house on the High Street, but Catholics in Erdington are mainly indebted to the Rev. Daniel H. Haigh, founder of the Church of SS Thomas & Edmund of Canterbury. He laid the foundation stone of the new church on 26 May 1848. The church was opened and consecrated by Bishop Ullathorne on 11 June 1850. The church is an example of the Gothic revival.

The plate was designed by Augustus Pugin and made by Hardman.

Abbey

The abbey was built on this land next to the church. Its building is also grade II listed.

Roman Catholic Redemptorists
The Benedictine monks were later displaced a second time, as a result of problems experienced by the predominantly German Beuronese Congregation during World War I (1914–18). After World War I, during which the community suffered aggravation, it was possible for the community to return to their homeland, and Erdington Abbey was disbanded.

The parish came under the control of the Redemptorist order of priests in 1922, and is currently served by Fr. Elias Gweme CSsR - Rector and Parish Priest, Fr. Francis Dickinson CSsR, Fr. Isaac Davies CSsR, and Fr. Royston Price CSsR.

Cemetery
The attached cemetery contains war graves of three soldiers of World War I and two soldiers and four Royal Air Force personnel of World War II.

References

External links
Original Erdington Abbey Parish Website
Official Erdington Abbey
Erdington Abbey, 1850-1876-2001 by Michael Hodgetts

Roman Catholic churches in Birmingham, West Midlands
Monasteries in the West Midlands (county)
Grade II listed buildings in Birmingham
Erdington
19th-century Christian monasteries
Roman Catholic churches completed in 1850
19th-century Roman Catholic church buildings in the United Kingdom
Redemptorist churches in the United Kingdom